Harry Sloan (born 16 July 1994) is a professional rugby player for Saracens. He plays as a centre and has previously played in the RFU Championship with Ealing Trailfinders and in Premiership Rugby with Harlequins.

He first took up rugby when his father took him to Kent side Cranbrook RFC. Sloan was offered a trial at Harlequins. He impressed and was added to their academy, later on joining the senior side.

While in the Harlequins Academy, Sloan was named in England's U20 squad, winning the 2013 Six Nations Under 20s Championship, before winning two consecutive Junior World Cup titles.

Sloan represented both London Scottish and Ealing Trailfinders as part of his development as a young player at Harlequins. During these spells he was dual registered and still eligible for selection at Harlequins.

Sloan made his Aviva Premiership debut in March 2014 after coming through Quins' academy. He signed a new contract with Harlequins on 11 January 2016 for an undisclosed length.

Sloan left Harlequins to join RFU Championship side Ealing Trailfinders ahead of the 2018–19 season.

He joined Saracens ahead of the 2020–21 season.

References

External links
 Harlequins Profile

1994 births
Living people
Ealing Trailfinders Rugby Club players
English rugby union players
Harlequin F.C. players
London Scottish F.C. players
People from Pembury
Rugby union players from Kent
Rugby union centres